Qaleh Lar (also Romanized as Qal‘eh Lar; also known as Qalātan) is a village in Solduz Rural District, in the Central District of Naqadeh County, West Azerbaijan Province, Iran. At the 2006 census, its population was 455, in 87 families.

References 

Populated places in Naqadeh County